Odette Meuter (born 13 July 1938) is a Belgian sports shooter. She competed at the 1976 Summer Olympics and the 1980 Summer Olympics.

References

1938 births
Living people
Belgian female sport shooters
Olympic shooters of Belgium
Shooters at the 1976 Summer Olympics
Shooters at the 1980 Summer Olympics
20th-century Belgian women